The National Technical Museum (NTM) in Prague is the largest institution dedicated to preserving information and artifacts related to the history of technology in the Czech Republic. The museum has large exhibits representing approximately 15% of its total collection. The museum also manages substantial archives consisting of approximately 3,500 linear shelf meters of archival material and about 250,000 books. The museum was founded in 1908 and has been in its current location (adjacent to Letná Park) since 1941.

History
The collections originate from the professional engineering school (founded in 1717 in Prague), continued by the Prague Polytechnical Institute (founded in 1806) and finally the opening of the Czech industrial museum, founded by Vojtěch Náprstek in 1874. Further parts of his collections were transferred to the museum later in the 20th century.
The modern origin is the Technical Museum of Bohemia, opened to the public in 1910 in the Schwarzenberg Palace, renamed the Czechoslovakian Technical Museum in 1918 (with the founding of the state of Czechoslovakia) and moved to its present building in 1942.  It was designed by Milan Babuška, the winner of an architectural competition in Functionalist style.  The collection moved out during Nazi occupation, then was gradually returned, only fully occupying the main building in the 1990s.

In 1995 three new galleries were opened: Industrial Design, Single Building, and Fine Arts.  Industrial design particularly featured early Czech motorcycles and light fittings, and their processes of manufacture.  The Single Building Gallery is used for quarterly exhibitions of models and designs of buildings which have some topical relevance such as an anniversary.  The Fine Arts gallery features paintings and sculptures from the 17th to 20th century of subjects related to industry, science and technology.

In 2001 the museum opened a Railroad Museum that contains about 100 railway vehicles.

The 2002 European floods caused damage to some 200 cubic metres of documents at the museum - in a location separate to the main building.  Work involved in drying and restoring the materials continued until 2013.

The National Technical Museum was closed from September 2006 to February 2011 for extensive renovations.

Significant exhibits 
Aviation pioneer Jan Kašpar donated the aircraft, with which he had flown his first flight from Pardubice to Velká Chuchle in 1911, to the National Technical Museum in Prague, where it is still on display among many other historic aircraft. Mercedes-Benz W154 (1939), Rudolf Caracciola's car is the most valuable exhibit of the muzeum. Tatra 80 (1935), President Tomáš Garrigue Masaryk's car is the most precious Czech car.

Exhibits

See also
Kbely Aviation Museum
List of museums in Prague

References

External links
 
 

National
Prague
Aerospace museums in the Czech Republic
Transport museums in the Czech Republic
Science museums in the Czech Republic
Prague